Handsome Boys of the 20th Century is a South Korean variety-reality show which aired on the cable channel QTV (ko). It began airing on April 16, 2013 and ran for two seasons with a total of 29 episodes.

Premise and concept
The show features five members from four disbanded or inactive "first-generation" K-pop idol groups, which debuted during the 1990s: H.O.T., Sechs Kies, NRG and g.o.d. H.O.T. is acknowledged to be the first ever highly successful K-pop idol group and was largely rivaled by Sechs Kies. NRG was a pioneer of what has now been termed as the Korean Wave (Hallyu; Hangul: 한류) and were the first Korean idol group to successfully break into the market in China. g.o.d was the first idol group to be dubbed "the nation's group" due to their broad popular appeal and became only the second K-pop idol group to have more than one album sell over a million copies.

Moon Hee-joon, leader of H.O.T., personally invited his H.O.T. bandmate Tony An, Sechs Kies leader and rapper Eun Ji-won, dancer and singer-songwriter Chun Myung-hoon of NRG and rapper Danny Ahn of g.o.d, all of whom were born in the same year (1978) and have remained active in the entertainment industry. They would meet in a rented house where they could have a candid chat about issues and topics that they had not been able to speak about due to the closed and highly taciturn culture of the K-pop industry while they were active as members of their groups. Moon had proposed the concept of the show following the success of the television series Reply 1997 and a renewed interest in first-generation K-pop idol groups.

Episodes

Season 1

Season 2

HOTSechgodRG
Upon meeting to film the first episode, the five entertainers decided to name their "group" HOTSechgodRG (핫젝갓알지), which combines all of their idol group names. They released a digital single (a remake of NRG's "You Can Do It") and music video, appeared together on Happy Together and other variety shows and performed on Immortal Songs: Singing the Legend. The single reached #72 on the Gaon Digital Chart. There were plans to hold a concert in December 2013 but with Tony An under investigation for illegal gambling, the four remaining members decided not to continue.

In 2014, Moon Hee-joon, Eun Ji-won, Danny Ahn and Chun Myung-hoon reunited and starred in Where Is My Superhero? (W.I.S.H) which aired on OnStyle. HOTSechgodRG did not make anymore appearances after that as Danny Ahn's group g.o.d had just recommenced group activities after a nine-year hiatus while Tony An was banned from television appearances by two major broadcasting stations due to his gambling conviction. The group remains close friends and have occasionally made guest appearances on one another's shows such as Eun Ji-won's travel show Plan Man.

Reception and impact
The show received considerable attention amongst long-time fans of the four groups and international netizens, especially after the episode of Immortal Songs: Singing the Legend which HOTSechgodRG participated in was broadcast and a subtitled version uploaded on YouTube by KBS World. Reception was generally positive as many long-time observers and fans commented that during the 1990s and early 2000s, members from different groups (especially H.O.T. and Sechs Kies) collaborating for a television show was inconceivable back then due to the highly exclusive nature of the industry and such interactions had been discouraged. According to the AGB Nielsen ratings, the first season had an average rating of 1.974% (a rating above 1% is considered a success for a cable channel in South Korea).

Riding on the increased interest in first-generation groups, DSP Media announced in November 2013 that its "DSP Festival" concert in December would also feature disbanded first-generation groups Sechs Kies and Click-B alongside current artists. Rumors also began circulating that HOTSechgodRG's respective idol groups would be reuniting; g.o.d came out of hiatus in May 2014 while Sechs Kies, pioneering girl group S.E.S. and NRG all reunited between 2016 and 2017.

Notes

References

External links
Official Website  on QTV

South Korean variety television shows
Korean-language television shows
2000s South Korean television series
2013 South Korean television series debuts